Procambarus echinatus,  the Edisto crayfish, is a species of crayfish in the family Cambaridae. It is endemic to the drainages of the Salkehatchie River and the south fork of the eponymous Edisto River in South Carolina.

References

Cambaridae
Freshwater crustaceans of North America
Endemic fauna of South Carolina
Crustaceans described in 1956
Taxa named by Horton H. Hobbs Jr.
Taxonomy articles created by Polbot